Sophie Williams (born 21 March 1991) is a British fencer. At the 2012 Summer Olympics she competed in the Women's individual sabre event, where she lost in the first round to the Italian Irene Vecchi. She is currently studying for a degree in Neuroscience at University College London.

References

1991 births
Living people
British female fencers
Olympic fencers of Great Britain
Fencers at the 2012 Summer Olympics